Emily Marie Neves (born July 29, 1982)  is an American voice actress, ADR director and script writer known for her work on English adaptations of Japanese anime shows and films associated with Funimation and Sentai Filmworks/Seraphim Digital. Some of her major voice roles include Kotomi Ichinose in Clannad, Kanade "Angel" Tachibana in Angel Beats, Minene Uryu in Future Diary, Yuko Kanoe in Dusk Maiden of Amnesia, Chelsea in Akame ga Kill!, Ayase Shinomiya in Guilty Crown and Umaru Doma from Himouto! Umaru-chan. In 2005, she was a preliminary contestant for the fourth season of American Idol at the Las Vegas auditions, where she advanced to the Hollywood round and was eliminated. She was a resident actress at the Alley Theatre in Houston.

Personal life
Neves married fellow voice actor Andrew Love in 2011. In 2015, she stated on her Twitter that they had amicably divorced.

Filmography

Anime

References

External links
 
 
 

American Idol participants
American stage actresses
American voice actresses
American voice directors
Sam Houston State University alumni
Living people
21st-century American actresses
Actresses from Houston
Actresses from New York City
21st-century American singers
Singers from New York City
Singers from Texas
Texas State University alumni
American sopranos
People from Conroe, Texas
Actresses from Dallas
21st-century American women singers
1982 births